This list of Denmark international footballers contains football players who have played for the Denmark national football team, listed according to their number of caps. As more than 750 players have played for the team since it started officially registering its players in 1908, only players with 25 or more official caps are included. Goalkeeper Sophus Hansen was the first Dane to reach 25 caps, doing so on June 5, 1919. Since then, more than 120 Danish footballers have reached 25 caps for the Danish national team.

Key

List of players

See also
Denmark national football team records and statistics
List of Denmark international footballers (1–24 caps)

References

 DBU Club 50
 DBU 25–49 games
 Palle "Banks" Jørgensen, "Landsholdets 681 profiler fra 1908 til i dag", TIPS-Bladet, 2002, 

 
Association football player non-biographical articles